Tolmiea is a genus of flowering plants in the saxifrage family containing two species native to western North America. The genus was formerly considered to be monotypic until diploid populations were split off as T. diplomenziesii from the tetraploid populations of T. menziesii.

The genus was named after the Scottish-Canadian botanist William Fraser Tolmie.

Species
There are 2 species: 
Tolmiea diplomenziesii
Tolmiea menziesii

References

Saxifragaceae
Flora of the West Coast of the United States
Flora of California
Flora of Oregon
Flora of Washington (state)
Flora of Alaska
Garden plants of North America
House plants
Groundcovers
Taxa named by John Torrey
Saxifragaceae genera